Kholod, Холод, is an Eastern Slavic surname. Notable people with the surname include:

Alena Kholod (born 1995), Russian acrobatic gymnast
Artem Kholod (born 2000), Ukrainian footballer
Vitaliy Kholod (born 2004), Ukrainian footballer

Surnames of Slavic origin